Uttar Pradesh Rajarshi Tandon Open University is a public university in Allahabad (Prayagraj), Uttar Pradesh, India. It is named after Rajarshi Purushottam Das Tandon.

Academics

Academic programmes
List of courses offered by university are as under:
First Degree Programmes
Post Graduate Programmes
General Diploma Programme
Certificate Programme
Computer Programmes
Vocational Programmes
Professional Programmes
Awareness Programmes
Adult & Continuing Education Programmes
Research Programme

Library
The university library was established in 2000 with a meagre collection of 279 books. At present, the library holds the collection on different streams of humanities, social sciences, natural sciences and developing sciences. Its collection has reached up to 41,387 volumes of books and 92 learned journals besides 5 daily newspapers and 12 other periodicals. The library serves faculty members, supporting staff, research scholars and more than 50,000 students spread all over Uttar Pradesh. It is the apex body to provide library and information services to its students and others. A regional library at Allahabad Regional Centre has opened as its branch library. It is also in planning to establish regional libraries at other region, Sector – F, Phaphamau, Allahabad. The librarian is Dr. T.N. Dubey.

References

External links 
Uttar Pradesh Rajarshi Tandon Open University

Open universities in India
Universities and colleges in Allahabad
Universities in Uttar Pradesh
Educational institutions established in 1999
1999 establishments in Uttar Pradesh